Ramapo Lake is a 120-acre man-made lake in Ramapo Mountain State Forest in Northern New Jersey.

Ramapo Lake originally consisting of a 25-acre pond named Rotten Poel (Rats Pond) by the Dutch. It was enlarged and deepened by Jacob Rogers in the late 19th century when he built a stone dam across its outlet.

Incidents

On August 7, 2018, at approximately 7 PM, two teens drowned in the lake.

References

Reservoirs in New Jersey
Bodies of water of Bergen County, New Jersey
Lakes of Passaic County, New Jersey